Starry is the debut album by the Canadian alternative rock band, The Killjoys. The album was recorded at the Soho Common Recording House in Hamilton, Ontario and was released in 1994. "Today I Hate Everyone", "Dana", and "Any Day Now" were released as singles. Originally independently released, it was re-released by WEA Canada, with tracks 1, 5, 7 & 8 remixed by Terry Brown.

Track listing 
All songs written by Mike Trebilcock, except where noted.

 "Today I Hate Everyone" – 2:16
 "Ungowa, Baby!" – 4:17
 "If I Were You" – 2:43
 "Candyland" – 3:23
 "Dana" – 2:20
 "Monkeysucker" – 1:08
 "Sally Won't" – 2:49
 "Any Day Now" – 2:43
 "Low" – 5:22
 "Headlong" (Trebilcock, Gene Champagne) – 3:15
 "Someplace" – 2:04

Personnel 
 Mike Trebilcock – guitar, vocals
 Gene Champagne – drums
 Shelley Woods – bass

Technical personnel 
 Tim Hevesi – production, engineering
 The Killjoys – production
 Mark S. Berry – additional production, mixing (tracks 2–4, 6, 9–11)
 Terry Brown – mixing at Metalworks Studios (tracks 1, 5, 7, 8)
 Brad Nelson – additional engineering
 Ed Krautner – additional engineering
 Howie Weinberg – mastering at Masterdisk (tracks 2–4, 6, 9–11)
 Peter Moore – mastering at the E-Room (tracks 1, 5, 7, 8)
 Antoine Moonen – cover design
 Mike Trebilcock – cover design

References 

The Killjoys (Canadian band) albums
1994 albums